Tree taper is the degree to which a tree's stem or bole decreases in diameter as a function of height above ground. Within Forestry and for the purposes of timber production, trees with a high degree of taper are said to have poor form, while those with low taper have good form. The opposite is the case for open-grown amenity trees. The form of a tree is sometimes quantified by the Girard form class, which is the ratio, expressed as a percentage, of the butt-log scaling diameter to diameter at breast height.

Taper is often represented by mathematical functions fitted to empirical data, called taper equations. One such function, attributed to Ormerod, is

where:

 = stem diameter at height h,

 = tree diameter at breast height,

 = tree total height,

 height of interest (h ≤ H), and

 = breast height.

Once developed, taper equations can be used to predict the diameter at a given height, or the height for a given diameter.

See also
 Judson Freeman Clark#International 1/4-inch log rule

Footnotes 

Forest modelling